Matthew Harris Gambill (born February 27, 1981) is an American politician from Cartersville, Georgia. Gambill is a Republican member of Georgia House of Representatives for District 15.

https://www.legis.ga.gov/members/house/4934?session=1029

References

Republican Party members of the Georgia House of Representatives
21st-century American politicians
Living people
1981 births